The Sting is a live album and DVD by the American heavy metal band W.A.S.P. Originally released as a DVD/CD set, it is also available as a CD on its own.

The concert was originally recorded and shown as a live webcast, which happened during the band's Helldorado World Tour. The DVD of the show (and the webcast) is the first live footage of the band to feature Blackie's signature microphone stand, dubbed 'Elvis' by band and fans alike. This album according to band members is known as The Sting.

It is alleged that Blackie is unhappy with the way the DVD and CD were produced, feeling that the sound is of an inferior quality.

Track listing
All songs written by Blackie Lawless, unless otherwise noted.

"Helldorado" – 3:20
"Inside the Electric Circus" – 1:45
"Chainsaw Charlie (Murders in the New Morgue)" – 5:48
"Wild Child" (Chris Holmes , Lawless) – 6:53
"L.O.V.E. Machine" – 6:14
"Animal (Fuck Like a Beast)" – 5:16
"Sleeping (In the Fire)" – 6:24
"Damnation Angels" – 5:59
"Dirty Balls" – 5:05
"The Real Me" (Pete Townshend) – 4:03 (The Who cover)
"I Wanna Be Somebody" – 8:24
"Blind in Texas" – 6:48

DVD extras
5.1 Surround Sound
Album Discography
Picture Gallery
Weblinks

Personnel
W.A.S.P.
 Blackie Lawless – lead vocals, rhythm guitar
 Chris Holmes – lead guitar
 Mike Duda – bass guitar, backing vocals
 Stet Howland – drums, backing vocals

References

2000 live albums
W.A.S.P. albums
Live video albums
2000 video albums